The  is a dam located in Imakane, Setana District, Hiyama, Hokkaidō, Japan.

At 1480 meters in length, it is the longest dam in Japan and the largest in southern Hokkaidō. It is known for hosting the longest fish race in Japan (2.4 km).

External links
 Pirika Dam 

Dams in Hokkaido
Dams completed in 1991
1991 establishments in Japan